Camash can refer to
 the perennial herb Camassia quamash
 a name for Commagene, the northern province of Syria, in the late 19th century
 a name for the city of Samosata in the late 19th century